The Black Frost is a 2015 Argentine drama film directed by Maximiliano Schonfeld. It was shown in the Panorama section at the 66th Berlin International Film Festival.

Cast
 Ailín Salas
 Lucas Schell

References

External links
 

2015 films
2015 drama films
Argentine drama films
2010s Spanish-language films
2010s Argentine films